Walter Rease Allman (February 27, 1884 – July 8, 1924) was an American cartoonist who created the newspaper gag comic The Doings of the Duffs. The strip was launched on July 30, 1914. Allman's last strip was dated January 16, 1924, but the strip continued under other artists until August 15, 1931.

Biography
Walter Allman worked in the grain business at a young age, but didn't have much interest in the trade, spending his time drawing on the sides of boxes and crates. His talent soon landed a job at an engraving company; he later found employment with the Toledo News-Bee newspaper.

His cartoon "work was picked up by the Scripps syndicate NEA Service and his comic Doings of the Duffs became a nationwide feature". An example of his work with the Toledo paper can be seen in 1912, honoring victims of the Titanic disaster.

His The Doings of the Duffs comic strip gained a similar level of fame with the public as the Mutt and Jeff strip had.
Allman was a cartoonist from 1915 to 1924. He died in Cleveland on July 8, 1924 at age 42 after suffering a nervous breakdown in 1923.

References

External links
 

American comic strip cartoonists
American comics artists
1884 births
1924 deaths